MN8 are a British R&B-pop group. They consisted of KG (co-founder, lead vocals), G-Man (co-founder, lead vocals), Kule T (vocals) and Dee Tails (rapper, backing vocalist, stylist and choreographer).

Career
MN8's 1995 debut hit single, "I've Got a Little Something for You", credited as written by Dennis Ingoldsby and Mark Taylor aka. Vintage Future American record producer and composer, produced by Dennis Charles & Ronnie Wilson became a success throughout Europe, Asia Pacific and the US. Notably, the song was one of P. Diddy's earliest Bad Boy Records remixes. It was featured in the film, Bad Boys. The song was also Columbia UK's first homegrown Top 10 record in over a decade, held off the number 1 spot in the UK Singles Chart by Celine Dion's "Think Twice" which topped the UK chart for seven weeks. Nonetheless, MN8 finished the year ahead of Seal's "Kiss from a Rose" as one of the biggest selling UK singles for the year. MN8 followed up with 6 more UK Top 30 hits including "If You Only Let Me In", "Baby It's You", "Tuff Act to Follow", "Dreaming", "Pathway to the Moon" and a cover of the Surface hit "Happy". 

Their debut album, To The Next Level reached number 13 in the UK Albums Chart. To The Next Level (produced by Dennis Charles & Ronnie Wilson) included a contribution from Pamela Sheyne, who wrote the song "Baby It's You". Besides P. Diddy and Sheyne, MN8 collaborated with the late Oji Pearce (Montell Jordan's "This Is How We Do It"), Simon Climie, Arthur Baker, Steve Silk Hurley, Conner Reeves, Blacksmith and Dalvin DeGrate (Jodeci). 

MN8 have toured alongside Janet Jackson, Diana King, Brownstone, Spice Girls, Madonna, Celine Dion, Robbie Williams, Boyzone, East 17, Backstreet Boys and Ricky Martin. They also appeared at the Smash Hits Poll Winners Party, Midem, Notting Hill Carnival, Sweden's Water Festival and other European music festivals.

In 1997, MN8 parted ways with Sony/Columbia & 1st Avenue. When the deal had expired, MN8 partnered with the French concert promoter Gerard Drouot to tour France in 1997 and 1998. After their last show at the end of 1998, MN8 decided to take a break indefinitely to pursue other opportunities.

In an interview with Digital Spy on 13 April 2009, lead singer KG said of the split and any prospects of a reunion: "Around 1998 and 1999 we did our last European shows. We were at the end of our deal with Sony and weren't really sure what we wanted to do. We decided to take a break and think things through. Quite a lot's happened in the past few months actually. We're in tentative talks about maybe putting MN8 back together and doing a tour. The thing about MN8 is that we never did the sort of music we should have done. We had the right aesthetic but the potential to do so much more. If you look at the commercial side of R&B these days, we would have fitted in better. We were kind of ahead of our time in some ways."

In 2013 co-lead singer G-man was interviewed by Twin B on BBC 1xtra where he announced that MN8 are still together and that a new MN8 album 'Reloaded' is the works and asserted MN8's pop music legacy and importance "How are you going to write a story about the best acts of the past 15 years, and not mention us". (Incidentally, it had been 16 years since MN8's last release.) G-man also revealed friendly rivalry with East 17, spending time with Robbie Williams, auditioning the Spice Girls for Sony before they were signed to Virgin and MN8's influence on some of pop music's most popular US and UK acts. As of 2018, no new material has been released.

In media
MN8 appeared on The Childliners record The Gift of Christmas alongside the Backstreet Boys, Boyzone, East 17, Peter Andre and Dannii Minogue.
MN8 hosted Top of the Pops on 14 March 1996.

Discography

Studio albums

Singles

As lead artist

As featured artist

References

MN8's chart history

MN8 on Janet Jackson tour

MN8 on Bad Boys Soundtrack

External links
MN8 official Myspace page

British contemporary R&B musical groups
English boy bands
New jack swing music groups
Black British musical groups
Columbia Records artists
Musical groups established in 1992